Young Heart Attack (YHA) are a high-energy rock band from Austin, Texas, that formed in 2001.  Chris "Frenchie" Smith and bassist Steven T. Hall had previously been in the Sixteen Deluxe and Joey Shuffield in Fastball.

Lineup

Original (2000–2005)

Chris Hodge - vocals/guitar
Jennifer Stephens - vocals
Chris "Frenchie" Smith - guitar
Steven T. Hall - bass
Joey Shuffield - drums

Current

Chris Hodge - vocals / guitar
Jennifer Stephens - vocals
Chris "Frenchie" Smith - guitar
Paul Etheredge - bass
Jayson Altman - drums

History
The band originally intended to have several female singers to achieve an almost gospelesque sound.  For a significant period during their early stages they were a seven-piece band, with members gradually coming and going until they ended up with what is considered the original lineup.

The band played a support slot for visiting UK rockers Gay Dad in Houston in 2001. Lead singer Cliff Jones was very taken with the band and returned to Austin, the band's base, to record demos at Chris "Frenchie" Smith's Bubble studios. These recordings were issued as a 7-inch single on Leo Silverman's Rex Records boutique imprint. More demos including "Tommy Shots" were recorded and the band signed to XL Records. The resulting album, Mouthful of Love, was critically acclaimed by the UK music press. Jones co-wrote and produced the album, which was recorded at the Bubble and at Willie Nelson's ranch studio on the Austin City limits. The band played several UK tours including an arena tour with The Darkness, and toured Australia with seminal rockers The Specimens.

In July 2004, Shuffield left the band to rejoin Fastball. He was replaced in YHA by Taylor Young. Young lived in Dallas, Texas, which made it very awkward to meet for rehearsal, and the lineup soon began to fall apart. Young then left the band to go back to university.

Shuffield rejoined the band just prior to their mini UK tour, which started at the end of May 2005.

After only one studio album, in early 2006 Young Heart Attack announced they were splitting up and ceased work on their second album. However the band regrouped later in 2006. Second album Rock and Awe was released in 2008.

Record label
Young Heart Attack were signed to XL Recordings until late 2004 when their A&R rep left the company. On 4 December 2007 it was announced that YHA had signed to Not on Your Radio in the UK.

Discography
Before signing to XL Recordings the band cut three 7" singles with indie label Rex Records. These singles were "Over and Over", "Mouthful of Love" and "Tommy Shots". Two of these singles would be re-released by XL Recordings, but these Rex singles, some of which are recorded with former members have achieved collectors items status among YHA fans.

"Over and Over" (single) (2003) XL, UK Singles #84
"Misty Rowe" (single) (2003) XL
Mouthful of Love [EP] (2003) XL - copies of this were initially sold on the band's tour with Motörhead and have since proved difficult to obtain.
Mouthful of Love (2004) XL
"Tommy Shots" (single) (2004) XL
"Starlite" (single) (2004) XL
Rock and Awe (2008) Not on Your Radio

Indie rock musical groups from Texas
Musical groups from Austin, Texas
2001 establishments in Texas